Mitch Brennan (born 30 October 1954) is a retired Australian rugby league footballer and former coach. A Queensland State of Origin representative three-quarter, he played club football during the 1970s, and 1980s in Queensland for Souths and Redcliffe and in New South Wales for South Sydney, Canberra and St. George, with whom he won the 1979 premiership. After playing he became coach of Wakefield Trinity from 1996 to 1997.

Club career

A stylish three-quarter with a great turn of pace, Mitch Brennan trialed with the Canadian Football League side the Toronto Argonauts in 1975 and was offered a contract before visa restrictions prevented his Canadian football career. He returned to Australia and was graded with Brisbane Souths.

St. George Dragons

His NSWRL career began controversially when in the 1977 pre-season, he was coaxed by his former coach Harry Bath to play for St George in a trial match at Grafton.  Brennan played under the pseudonym 'Mickey Lane' because he was still in contract negotiations with Brisbane Souths. He was recognised and fined $500. He joined St George in 1978.

He was a twice winner of the mid-week competition's ‘golden try’ award in 1978 & 1981. He was the NSWRL's  equal leading try-scorer (16t) in  season 1979 and played on the wing and scored a try in St George's  1979 Grand Final win over Canterbury. 

Souths and Canberra

Brennan switched to the South Sydney Rabbitohs in 1981 and played 41 first grade matches over two seasons. He returned to  Queensland in 1983 and played with the Redcliffe Dolphins and captaining them until 1985. In 1986 Brennan returned to the NSWRL with the Canberra Raiders.  His three seasons there up till retirement in 1988 were significantly interrupted by injury and he made only 8  first grade appearances.for Canberra.

Origin career
He made his State of Origin debut for Queensland  in the sole game played under Origin criteria in 1981. He appeared in games I and III of 1982  at  centre and full-back respectively and in game III  of 1983 on the wing. He scored three tries in his four Origin appearances.

References

Sources
http://www.showroom.com.au/dragons/dragonshistory Dragons History site
https://web.archive.org/web/20070817154435/http://www.bulldogs.com.au/main.php  Bulldogs Player Histories (Official Site)
https://web.archive.org/web/20070829213148/http://www.raiders.com.au/www/history/alltime/ Canberra Raiders All Time Player List (Official Site)

External links

Queensland Representatives at qrl.com.au

1954 births
Living people
Australian rugby league coaches
Australian rugby league players
Canberra Raiders players
Queensland Rugby League State of Origin players
Redcliffe Dolphins players
Rugby league centres
Rugby league fullbacks
Rugby league players from Brisbane
Rugby league wingers
South Sydney Rabbitohs captains
South Sydney Rabbitohs players
Souths Logan Magpies players
St. George Dragons players
Wakefield Trinity coaches